John Redcorn III (born October 17, 1961) is a fictional character in the Fox animated series King of the Hill. He is invariably addressed or referred to as "John Redcorn" or "Mr. Redcorn" by every character in the series, and is never addressed or referred to simply as "John"

Description 
A former roadie for Winger and "Licensed New Age Healer", John Redcorn is Nancy Gribble's Native American masseur, her lover of 14 years (the two split up during the show's fourth season) and the biological father of her son Joseph Gribble. Both Nancy's husband Dale Gribble and Joseph are completely unaware of this, although it is obvious to everyone else in the neighborhood due to the time John Redcorn spends with Nancy and the close resemblance between Joseph and John Redcorn. John Redcorn has a sister, whom Nancy seems to assume told everyone about their affair. A recurring gag is that whenever Dale makes a comment about being Joseph's father, John Redcorn shows up. In season 5, episode 4, it is implied that John Redcorn is Puebloan, as the "Anasazi" are referenced as his ancestors.

In episode 38 (season 3, episode 3), Peggy Hill, still oblivious to the relationship between John Redcorn and Nancy, goes to him for help with a real headache. When her husband, series protagonist Hank Hill, confronts John Redcorn, John Redcorn says he would never "heal" Peggy the way he heals "the wives of others", implying that he has slept with many married women.

John Redcorn drives a tan Jeep Wrangler and becomes the lead singer of the band Big Mountain Fudgecake, for which Lucky Kleinschmidt plays guitar and Dale is briefly the manager. John Redcorn has had a long-time desire to be a professional musician. The band isn't very good, and after it doesn't take off, it breaks up. Dale re-works John Redcorn’s image as a performer of children's songs and establishes him as "The Native American Raffi", as Dale puts it. John Redcorn begins singing toned-down solo acoustic children's versions of his songs at the Strickland company barbecue and becomes instantly popular. It was revealed that Big Mountain Fudgecake got back together near the end of the episode "Earthly Girls are Easy". When driving, he is often heard playing Pat Benatar songs, including the hits "Hit Me With Your Best Shot" and "Heartbreaker". He is also notable for playing music from the band Foreigner, such as "Hot Blooded" and "Double Vision".

John Redcorn is often seen reading a book about Native American rights in North America, entitled This Land is Our Land. A recurring gag is that when he begins speaking about matters related to Native traditions and their spiritual meanings, his long black hair is dramatically whisked up in a breeze. Despite his dedication to his heritage, it has sometimes backfired on him. When Bobby Hill becomes interested in Native American rights, John Redcorn seems pleased (although his original intention was to get Joseph interested in his heritage). However, Bobby discovers that John Redcorn's ancestors engaged in cannibalism, which then causes a mortified John Redcorn to have to explain to everyone how that practice was discontinued centuries ago.

As a recurring gag, Dale sees several signs of the affair but always draws the wrong conclusions. On one occasion, he finds him trying to sneak inside to have sex with Nancy but thinks he is trying to steal his mower; when Dale reports having a vision of a Native American making love with his wife and Joseph (in full Native American ceremonial garb) being handed to him, he then assumes that means he is part Native American himself; when John Redcorn says straight to a TV camera that "I slept with Hank's best friend's wife for 13 years" with Dale inches away, Dale thinks he means Bill Dauterive's wife and not his. John Redcorn's access to Nancy is caused primarily by Dale ignorantly allowing him to be her masseur and often trusting her to him to keep her away from other men who may have affairs with her. It is revealed in Season 6 that Dale believes John Redcorn to be gay, which partially explains his contentment with letting him be alone with his wife so often.

John Redcorn has a predictably difficult relationship with Dale; though he considers him a good man, he is jealous of his relationship with Nancy and Joseph, and exasperated by how Dale's eccentricities influence Joseph. He seems depressed that he was not more of a father to Joseph, which is later partially resolved when Nancy reveals to Joseph that since they all are "from the Earth", John Redcorn and Joseph are in fact related. In "Nancy Boys", after Dale helps him with a lawsuit against the Federal government, John Redcorn calls Dale "a true friend" and cites this as a reason for agreeing to split up with Nancy; he made a similar comment to Hank regarding Peggy in an earlier episode. However, later in the series in the episode "Hair Today, Gone Tomorrow", he would (unsuccessfully) attempt to reconnect with Nancy.

John Redcorn and Joseph are especially estranged. Whenever John Redcorn tries to engage Joseph and introduce him to Native American practices and rituals, Joseph doesn't show any interest. John Redcorn shows special interest in forging a real bond in "Spin The Choice", to no avail—until Nancy takes Joseph aside and sets him straight; it is implied she finally tells him about his true parentage. While he still considers Dale his father, Joseph starts to treat John Redcorn as a mentor in "Vision Quest". 

In the season 12 episode "Three Men and a Bastard", John Redcorn finds out he has a daughter named Kate by a woman named Charlene during the same period that he was having an affair with Nancy. John Redcorn had forgotten about it since, and Nancy was not happy when she learned about his double affair. Charlene then falls for Bill and moves her family in with him; likewise, Kate and Joseph fall for each other, which disturbs all the characters aware of the children's shared parentage. At the end of the episode, Charlene and her two kids leave Bill and move in with John Redcorn, although they are never seen or mentioned for the rest of the series.

John Redcorn is 6'4".

References 

Adultery in television
Animated characters introduced in 1997
Fictional characters from Texas
Fictional Native American people
Fictional rock musicians
Fictional singers
King of the Hill characters
Male characters in animated series
Television characters introduced in 1997